Brynmor is a given name. Notable people with the name include:

David Brynmor Anthony (1886–1966), teacher and academic administrator
Brynmor John (1934–1988), British Labour politician
David Brynmor Jones (1851–1921), Welsh barrister and politician
Keith Brynmor Jones (born 1944), Church of England priest
Brynmor Williams (born 1951), Welsh rugby union player

See also
Brynmor Jones Library, main library at the University of Hull
Bryn (disambiguation)

Welsh masculine given names